Helle Fagralid (born 11 May 1976) is a Danish actress who has appeared in number of feature films and television series.

Career 
Fagralid played Iben in the TV-series Nikolaj og Julie (2002–2003), Freja, the goddess of love, in the TV-series Jul i Valhal (2005) and Maja Zeuthen, mother of the missing Emilie Zeuthen, in the popular TV-series Forbrydelsen III.

She is one of the two female leads in Laurits Munch-Petersen's Mellem os (2003), which among its many international awards won the Student Oscar as Honorary Foreign Film 2004.

Among her theatrical starring roles is Julie, the sympathetic hostage in the action-thriller Ambulancen (2005).

Filmography

References

External links 

1976 births
Danish child actresses
Danish film actresses
Danish television actresses
Danish stage actresses
Living people
People from Helsingør